Chelisochinae is a subfamily of earwigs in the Chelisochidae, a family whose members are commonly known as black earwigs.

Species
This subfamily includes the following genera:

 Adiathella Brindle, 1970
 Adiathetus Burr, 1907
 Chelisoches Scudder, 1876
 Euenkrates Rehn, 1927
 Exypnus Burr, 1907
 Gressitolabis Brindle, 1970
 Hamaxas Burr, 1907
 Lamprophorella Mjöberg, 1924
 Proreus Burr, 1907
 Schizochelisoches Steinmann, 1987
 Schizoproreus Steinmann, 1987
 Solenosoma Burr, 1907

References

Dermaptera subfamilies
Chelisochidae